The 37th BRDC International Trophy, was the opening round of the 1985 International Formula 3000. The inaugural was held at Silverstone, on 24 March.

Report

Entry
A total of 17 F3000 cars were entered for the first ever event.  Every new formula sets new questions and this one was no exception; some teams ran ex-Formula One machinery, while the Lola T950 was based upon an IndyCar design, whereas Ralt and March drew upon their Formula Two experience.

Qualifying
Michel Ferté took pole position for Equipe Oreca, in their March Engineering-Cosworth 85B, averaging a speed of 135.404 mph.

Race

The race was held over 44 laps of the Silverstone Grand Prix circuit. Mike Thackwell wrote himself into the history books by winning the International Trophy for the third time and the first F3000 race in the process, driving a works Ralt RT20 from teammate John Nielsen in a similar car. Thackwell won in a time of 1hr 07:41.01mins., averaging a speed of 114.397 mph, with Nielsen over 34 seconds behind. The next three places were filled by March 85Bs in the hands of Michel Ferté, Christian Danner and Gabriele Tarquini, with the sixth place going to a Formula One Tyrrell 012, driven by Roberto Moreno.

Classification

Race Result

 Fastest lap: John Nielsen, 1:27.64secs. (121.191 mph)

References

BRDC
International Formula 3000
BRDC International Trophy